Phìn Hồ may refer to several places in Vietnam:

Phìn Hồ, Điện Biên, a rural commune of Nậm Pồ District
, a rural commune of Sìn Hồ District